Huamelultec (also known as Huamelula Chontal, Lowland Oaxaca Chontal, or Chontal de la Costa de Oaxaca) is one of the Chontal languages of Oaxaca, Mexico. It is spoken in the Oaxacan municipalities of San Pedro Huamelula (settlements of Barra de la Cruz, El Bejuco, El Coyul, El Gavilán, El Limón, El Porvenir, Guayacán, Los Cocos, Maximino Cruz (Rancho Maximino Cruz), Morro Ayuta, Paja Blanca, Río Papaya, Río Seco, San Isidro Chacalapa, San Pedro Huamelula, Santa María (Santa María Huamelula), and Tapanala), Santiago Astata (settlements of La Cotorra, La Tortolita (Fraccionamiento la Tortolita), Santiago Astata, Zaachila, and Zaachilac), and Tehuantepec (settlement of Morro Mazatán).
The name has been misspelled Tlamelula.

Phonology

Vowels

Consonants 

 /n/ is regularly pronounced as [ŋ] when in coda position, unless followed by an alveolar consonant.
 Glottalized sounds /fʼ, ɬʼ/ are also said to have been pronounced as affricates [pɸʼ, tɬʼ].

See also

Huamelultec vocabulary list on the Spanish Wikipedia

References

Tequistlatecan languages
Endangered indigenous languages of the Americas